Live at the Bimhuis Set 1 & 2 is a 2005 live album by jazz trumpeter Dave Douglas. The album was recorded at the Bimhuis in Amsterdam and released by Greenleaf Music.

Track listing
 "Penelope" - 23:57
 "The Infinite" - 12:22
 "Poses" (Wainwright) - 9:22
 "Caterwaul" - 3:37
 "Waverly" - 17:35
 "The Frisell Dream" - 5:12
 "Unison" (Björk) - 11:44
 "Ramshackle" (Beck) - 7:57
 "Deluge" - 23:09
All compositions by Dave Douglas unless otherwise noted

Personnel
Dave Douglas: trumpet
Rick Margitza: tenor saxophone, bass clarinet
Uri Caine: Fender Rhodes 
James Genus: bass
Clarence Penn: drums

External links
Live At The Bimhuis on Discogs

Dave Douglas (trumpeter) live albums
Greenleaf Music live albums
2005 live albums